The thick-lipped gourami (Trichogaster labiosa) is a species of gourami native to Southeast Asia, and is a popular aquarium fish.

Description
Thick-lipped gouramis can reach a length of  TL. They are sexually dimorphic, with the female being silvery, but the male marked with oblique thin red and blue stripes along its flanks.

Distribution
This fish is a freshwater species native to south Myanmar. It has also been introduced into Colombia.

Reproduction
Like most other gouramis, the thick-lipped gourami builds a bubble nest into which the eggs are placed. The male guards the eggs but ignores the fry.

In the aquarium
The thick-lipped gourami has been widely transported around the world for the aquarium fish industry. It is a generally peaceful fish for a tropical community aquarium. Like other Trichogaster species, it tends to be a bit shy and hides under plant life when it feels threatened. They eat a variety of foods including flake foods, bloodworms, and brine shrimp. Aquarists avoid keeping these fish with barbs or other fin-nippers who may damage their thread-like ventral fins. T. labiosa are known to breed well. The male builds bubble nests and is not as likely as other species to bully the female if the female is not yet ready to spawn.

The thick-lipped gourami has been deliberately crossbred with the banded gourami and the dwarf gourami to produce hybrids with new color patterns; these colors include gold, red, and green.

References

thick-lipped gourami
Fish of Myanmar
thick-lipped gourami
Taxa named by Francis Day